The 2022 Daniil Medvedev tennis season officially began on 3 January 2022, with the start of the ATP Cup. 

Fresh off winning his first major at the 2021 US Open, Medvedev reached the final of the 2022 Australian Open, losing to Rafael Nadal in five epic sets.

He clinched the world number 1 ranking for 16 weeks.

Yearly summary

Early hard court season

ATP Cup

Australian Open

Medvedev started the Australian open with a straight set win against Henri Laaksonen and four-set win against Nick Kyrigios. Medvedev lost in the final to Nadal in five epic sets.

Mexican Open

Medvedev lost in the semifinals to Nadal.

Indian Wells Masters

Medvedev lost in the third round to Gaël Monfils.

Miami Open

Medvedev lost in the quarterfinal to the defending champion Hubert Hurkacz.

Clay Court Season

Monte-Carlo Masters

Medvedev withdrew after choosing to have a hernia surgery which would keep him out of action for one to two months.

Geneva Open

French Open

Grass Court Season

Libéma Open

Wimbledon

Halle Open

North American hard court season

Los Cabos Open
Daniil Medvedev defeated the defending champion Cameron Norrie in the final, 7–5, 6–0 to win the men's singles title at the 2022 Los Cabos Open. It was his career's fourteenth ATP title.

Canadian Open
Medvedev was the defending champion, but lost in the second round to Nick Kyrgios.

Cincinnati Masters
At the Cincinnati Masters, Medvedev was defeated by Stefanos Tsitsipas in the semifinals.

US Open
Medvedev was yet again defeated by Kyrgios at the US Open in the fourth round, resulting in Medvedev losing his number one ranking.

All matches

This table chronicles all the matches of Daniil Medvedev in 2022.

Singles matches

Doubles matches

Schedule
Per Daniil Medvedev, this is his current 2022 schedule (subject to change).

Singles schedule

Yearly records

Head-to-head matchups
Daniil Medvedev has a  ATP match win–loss record in the 2022 season. Bold indicates player was ranked top 10 at the time of at least one meeting. The following list is ordered by number of wins:

  Felix Auger-Aliassime 2–0
  Ilya Ivashka 2–0
  Miomir Kecmanović 2–0
  Denis Shapovalov  2–0
  Botic van de Zandschulp 2–0
  Roberto Bautista Agut 2–1
  Pablo Andújar 1–0
  Facundo Bagnis 1–0
  Nikoloz Basilashvili  1–0
  Ričardas Berankis 1–0
  Matteo Berrettini 1–0
  Jenson Brooksby 1–0
  Maxime Cressy  1–0
  Grigor Dimitrov 1–0
  Laslo Đere 1–0
  Taylor Fritz   1–0
  David Goffin 1–0
  Rinky Hijikata 1–0
  Aslan Karatsev 1–0
  Karen Khachanov 1–0
  Stefan Kozlov 1–0
  Henri Laaksonen 1–0
  Tomáš Macháč 1–0
  Adrian Mannarino 1–0
  Pedro Martínez 1–0
  Alex de Minaur 1–1
  Andy Murray 1–0
  Yoshihito Nishioka 1–0
  Cameron Norrie  1–0
  Oscar Otte  1–0
  Arthur Rinderknech 1–0
  Emil Ruusuvuori  1–0
  Gilles Simon 1–0
  Jannik Sinner  1–0
  Dominic Thiem 1–0
  Wu Yibing 1–0
  Albert Ramos Viñolas 1–0
  Nick Kyrgios 1–2
  Stefanos Tsitsipas 1–2
  Marin Čilić 0–1
  Richard Gasquet 0–1
  Ugo Humbert 0–1
  Gaël Monfils 0–1
  Tim van Rijthoven 0–1
  Andrey Rublev 0–1
  Stan Wawrinka 0–1
  Novak Djokovic  0–2
  Hubert Hurkacz 0–2
  Rafael Nadal 0–2

* Statistics correct .

Top 10 wins

Finals

Singles: 5 (2 title, 3 runners-up)

{|class="sortable wikitable"
!Result
!class="unsortable"|W–L
!Date
!Tournament
!Tier
!Surface
!Opponent
!class="unsortable"|Score
|-style="background:#f3e6d7;"
| style="background:#ffa07a;"|Loss
| 0–1
| 
| Australian Open, Australia
| Grand Slam
| style="background:#ccf;" | Hard
|  Rafael Nadal
| 6–2, 7–6(7–5), 4–6, 4–6, 5–7
|-
| style="background:#ffa07a;"|Loss
|0–2
|
|s'Hertogenbosch, Netherlands
|250 Series
|style="background:#cfc;"|Grass
| Tim van Rijthoven
|4–6, 1–6
|-
| style="background:#ffa07a;"|Loss
|0–3
|
|style="background:#d4f1c5"| Halle Open, Germany
|style="background:#d4f1c5"|
|style="background:#cfc;"|Grass
| Hubert Hurkacz
|1–6, 4–6
|-
|style="background:#98fb98;"|Win
|1–3
|
|Los Cabos Open, Mexico
|250 Series
| style="background:#ccf;" | Hard
| Cameron Norrie
|7–5, 6–0
|-
|style="background:#98fb98;"|Win
|2–3
|
|style="background:#d4f1c5;"|Vienna Open, Austria
|style="background:#d4f1c5;"|500 Series
| style="background:#ccf;" |Hard (i)
| Denis Shapovalov
|4–6, 6–3, 6–2

Earnings

Bold font denotes tournament win

 Figures in United States dollars (USD) unless noted. 
source：2022 Singles Activity
source：2022 Doubles Activity

See also

 2022 ATP Tour
 2022 Rafael Nadal tennis season
 2022 Novak Djokovic tennis season
 2022 Carlos Alcaraz tennis season

Notes

References

External links 
 ATP tour profile

Medvedev
2022 in Russian sport